Ixiolirion tataricum, commonly known as the Siberian lily or the lavender mountain lily, is native to central and southwest Asia from the Sinai Peninsula to Xinjiang Province of China. Flower color ranges from light blue to dark violet.

Notes

External links

Kew Plant List
IPNI Listing

Ixioliriaceae
Flora of temperate Asia
Plants described in 1776